25/7 is the seventeenth studio album by Puerto Rican singer Víctor Manuelle, released on March 23, 2018 through Kiyavi Corp. and distributed by Sony Music Latin. The album title alludes to the 25th anniversary of Manuelle's career in music. The album features guest artists such as Gilberto Santa Rosa, Farruko, Bad Bunny, and Yandel, among others.

The album featured the singles "Amarte Duro" and "Mala y Peligrosa". At the 19th Annual Latin Grammy Awards, the album won the Grammy Award for Best Salsa Album.

Commercial performance 
The album was released in the United States on March 23, 2018. The Recording Industry Association of America (RIAA) certified 25/7 Latin gold on April 19, 2020, for shipments of 30,000 copies.

Track listing

Personnel 
Adapted from the liner notes of 25/7.

Performers

Charts

Weekly charts

Year-end charts

Certifications

References 

2018 albums
Víctor Manuelle albums
Sony Music Latin albums
Latin Grammy Award for Best Salsa Album